was the fifth season of the show  and the ninth season of Survivor to air in Spain; it was broadcast on Telecinco from January 17, 2008 to March 27, 2008. This season took place in Honduras. The show was presented by Jesús Vázquez, with Mario Picazo and Emma García acting as hosts of side programs. For this season the show temporarily returned to its original format by dividing the contestants into two tribes, white and black, which eventually merged. Due to a tropical disease and no sign of recovery, in week three of this season it was decided that Mario Picazo would leave his role as presenter to recover and was replaced by Oscar Martinez, during that time. Ultimately, it was Miriam Sánchez who won this season over Leo Segarra and Lely Céspedes, taking home €200,000 and a car.

Finishing order

Nominations table 

: In week one, the contestants were split into two tribes and nominated separately as groups.
: As the winner of the immunity challenge, Lely was given the power to name a nominee.
: As the winner of the immunity challenge, Karmele was given the power to name a nominee..
: As the winner of the immunity challenge, Leo was given the power to name a nominee..
: As the winner of the immunity challenge, Miriam was given the power to name a nominee.
: As the winner of the immunity challenge, Patxi was given the power to name a nominee.
: There was a tie between Miriam and Lely and Patxi, as leader, broke it nominating Miriam.
: As the winner of the immunity challenge, Michel was given the power to name a nominee.
: There was a tie between Miriam and Patxi and Michel, as leader, broke it nominating Patxi.
: As the winner of the immunity challenge, Miriam was given the power to name a nominee.
: As they lost the final immunity challenge, Nekal, Leo, and Miriam were automatically nominated for elimination.

External links
http://www.telecinco.es/supervivientes/

Survivor Spain seasons